Naam Iruvar Namakku Iruvar (We Two, For Us Two) is a 2018 Indian Tamil television series which premiered on Star Vijay and streams on Disney+ Hotstar. The first season followed the story of twin brothers Mayan and Aravind, both played by Mirchi Senthil. Then, the second season followed a different pair of twins: Mayan and Maaran, again played by Senthil.

The first season starred Senthil Kumar, Raksha Holla and Rashmi Jayraj. The second season stars Senthil Kumar, Rachitha Mahalakshmi, Monisha Arshak and Bavithra.

Overview

Plot

Season 1
Identical twin brothers Aravind and Mayan are separated soon after birth; Aravind is given to a childless couple and raised in the city, and Mayan remains with his family in the village. Aravind learns that he was adopted, and sets out to meet his real parents and twin brother thirty years later. Sandhanapandi has been married twice. He has three children (Devi, Karthik and Vidhya) with his first wife, Valli, and a daughter (Thamarai) with Parvathy, his second wife.

A marriage is arranged between Aravind and Devi, but Aravind is kidnapped a few days before the wedding by Machakkalai, Parvathy's brother. He and Parvathy want to take revenge on Sandhanapandi by having Aravind marry Thamarai instead. Mayan assumes Aravind's identity and marries Devi, and Aravind is forced to marry Thamarai. Thamarai is not accepted by her mother-in-law, Gowri, and Mayan is not accepted by Devi's family. However, both make their respective spouses love them. Due to the COVID-19 pandemic, the season's production was forced to shut down on 26 March 2020.

Season 2
Twin brothers Mayan and Maaran are separated at birth; their parents separate, and his mother leaves with Maaran. Mayan is angry with his father, Raja Rathinam, because he marries Naachiyar. He leaves the house and is raised by his uncle, Rathinavel, for over 25 years. Mayan falls in love with his cousin Mahalakshmi (Maha), a straightforward teacher who is Rathinavel's daughter. She dislikes him, despite Rathinavel's support.

Maha becomes engaged to Surya. Mayan tries to stop the wedding, succeeding when Surya's father incurs a large gambling debt. Rathinavel has a second heart attack, and refuses surgery. His doctor asks Maha and Mayan to keep him calm for a year, and Mayan convinces Maha to be happy with her.

Cast

Main

Season 1 (2018-2020)
 Senthil Kumar as:
Mayan - Devi's husband and Aravind's twin brother 
Dr. Aravind - Thamarai's husband, Devi's former fiancé and Mayan's twin brother
 Raksha Holla as Devi
 Rashmi Jayraj as Thamarai Aravind

Season 2 (2020-2022)
 Senthil Kumar as:
MayanRajarathnam and Saradha's elder son, Nachiyar's elder stepson, Maran's twin brother and Maha's husband 
MaranRajarathnam and Saradha's younger son, Nachiyar's younger stepson and Mayan's twin brother
 Rachitha Mahalakshmi (2020November 2021) as Mahalakshmi Mayan ("Maha")Mayan's wife and cousin, a teacher
 Monisha Arshak (November 2021June 2022) as Maha (Replacement of Mahalakshmi)
 Bavithra (2022) as Thamarai Maran Maran's wife

Supporting

Season 1
 Sabitha Anand as Gowri ViswanathanAravind's foster mother 
 Azhagu as RathinavelMayan, Aravind, Malar, Sakthi and Anandhi's father
 Padmini as Selvi RathinavelMayan, Aravind, Malar, Sakthi and Anandhi's mother
 Raviraj as ViswanathanAravind's foster father, and Rathinavel's best friend
 Madhu Mohan as SandanapandiDevi, Thamarai, Karthick and Vidhya's father
 Deepa Nethran as Valli SandanapandiDevi, Karthick and Vidhya's mother and Sandanapandi's first wife
 Premi Venkat as Parvathi SandanapandiThamarai's mother and Sandanapandi's second wife
 Sasindhar Pushpalingam as KarthickSandanapandi and Valli's son, Devi's younger brother and Anandhi's husband
 Vanitha Hariharan as Anandhi KarthickRathinavel's younger daughter, Mayan's younger sister and Karthick's wife
 Ashritha Sreedas as Vidhya SandanapandiSandanapandi and Valli's younger daughter, Devi's younger sister and Sakthi's love interest
 Kalpana Sri as MalarRathinavel's elder daughter and Mayan's elder sister
 Madhan as SakthivelRathinavel's younger son and Mayan's younger brother
 RJ Shivakanth as RightMayan's best friend
 Parthiban as LingamValli's brother and Devi, Karthick and Vidhya's uncle
 Rekha Nair as Thenu LingamLingam's wife and Devi, Karthick and Vidhya's aunt
 Deepa Shree as SwarnamGowri's sister's daughter and Aravind's foster cousin
 Maanas Chavali as Thirukumaran  Red KumarThamarai's former fiancé
 T. V. V. Ramanujam as Devi, Thamarai, Karthick and Vidhya's grandfather

Season 2
 Sabitha Anand as Nachiyar RajarathnamRajarathnam's second wife, Mayan and Maran's stepmother, Gayathri, Sharanya and Aishwarya's mother, Maha's and Thamarai's stepmother-in-law, Kathiresan, Pandi and Karthik's mother-in-law
 Gayatri Yuvaraj as Gayathri KathiresanKathiresan's wife, Rajarathnam and Nachiyar's eldest daughter, Mayan and Maran's half-sister and Maha and Thamarai's half-sister-in-law; previously engaged to Muthuraj and Aadhavan
 Janani Ashok Kumar as Sharanya PandiPandi's wife, Rajarathnam and Nachiyar's second daughter, Mayan and Maran's half-sister and Maha and Thamarai's half-sister-in-law
 Vaishnavi Arulmozhi as Aishwarya karthik karthik wife, Muthurasu's ex-wife, Rajarathnam and Nachiyar's youngest daughter, Mayan and Maran's half-sister and Maha and Thamarai's half-sister-in-law
 Prabhakaran Chandran as RathnavelMaha and Kasthuri's father, Parvathy's husband, Sharadha's elder brother, Mayan and Maran's maternal uncle and Mayan's father-in-law
 Deepa Nethran as Parvathy RathnavelMaha and Kasthuri's mother, Rathnavel's wife, Mayan and Maran's maternal aunt and Mayan's mother-in-law
 Premi Venkat as SharadhaRajarathnam's ex-wife, Mayan and Maran's mother, Rathnavel's sister and Maha's and Thamarai's mother-in-law 
 Raju Jeyamohan as Kathiresan (a.k.a. Kathi)Mayan's best friend and Gayathri's husband
 Sasindhar Pushpalingam as KarthikDSP and Aishwarya's husband
 Praveen Devasagayam as PandiSharanya's husband, Thamarai's brother
 Ashritha Sreedas as Kasthuri RathnavelMaha's younger sister and Rathnavel's younger daughter
 David Solomon Raja as ChidambaramNachiyar's brother, Gayathri, Sharanya and Aishwarya's uncle and Muthuraj's father
 Deepa Shree as Vadivukkarasi (vadivu) ChidambaramChidambaram's wife, Gayathri, Sharanya and Aishwarya's aunt and Muthuraj's mother
 Parthiban as MaasaaniVadivu's brother,  Muthuraj's uncle and Pandi's father 
 Sathya Raaja as Muthuraj ChidhambaramAishwarya's ex-husband, Vadivu and Chidhambaram's son and Gayathri's former fiancé
 Singapore Deepan as MurugeshMayan's friend
 Karthik as PandiMaasaani's son 
 R. Aravindraj as VishwanathanRajarathnam's friend
 Sivan Srinivasan as RajarathnamMayan, Maran, Gayathri, Sharanya and Aishwarya's father, Saradha's ex-husband and Nachiyar's husband 
 Navin Vetri as SuryaMaha's former fiancé
 R. J. Sivakanth as Dancing Drouser (a.k.a. DD)Maran's friend and manager

Development

Casting

Season 1: (2018-2020)

The season featured Senthil Kumar in his first dual role as Mayan and Aravind. Raksha Holla starred as Devi. Rashmi Jayraj played Thamarai, and Sabitha Anand, Vanitha Hariharan, Sasindhar Pushpalingam, Premi Venkat, Raviraj, Madhu Mohan, Azhagu, Padmini, Deepa Nethran, Ashritha Sreedas, Madhan, Parthiban and R. J. Shivakanth had supporting roles.

Season 2: (2020–2022)

Because of the suspension of shooting due to the COVID-19 outbreak, season one ended on 27 March 2020. The series resumed as season 2 on 27 July 2020, four months later, with a different storyline and cast. It stars Kumar and Rachitha Mahalakshmi, with Gayatri Yuvaraj, Janani Ashokkumar, Vaishnavi Arulmozhi, Sabitha Anand, Deepa Nethran, Raju Jeyamohan, David Solomon, Sathya, Parthiban and Ashritha Sreedas in supporting roles.

Adaptations

Crossovers
Season one had a crossover with Raja Rani from episodes 335 to 339. Season two had a crossover with Senthoora Poove from 9 to 20 November 2020.

References

External links
Website at Hotstar

Star Vijay original programming
2010s Tamil-language television series
2018 Tamil-language television series debuts
2020 Tamil-language television seasons
2022 Tamil-language television series endings
Tamil-language comedy television series
Tamil-language romance television series
Tamil-language television shows